Batrachedra garritor is a moth in the family Batrachedridae. It is found in North America, where it has been recorded from Arizona.

References

Natural History Museum Lepidoptera generic names catalog

Batrachedridae
Moths described in 1966